The Morris Operation in Grundy County, Illinois, United States, is the location of the only permanent (the rest are temporary) de facto high-level radioactive waste storage site in the United States and holds 772 tons of spent nuclear fuel. It is owned by GE Hitachi Nuclear Energy and located near the city of Morris. The site is located immediately southwest of Dresden Generating Station. Spent nuclear fuel assemblies are stored at this away-from-reactor, Independent Spent Fuel Storage Installation (ISFSI) in a spent fuel storage pool. The storage basins at the Morris Operation store spent high-level radioactive waste from Connecticut Yankee Nuclear Power Plant, Cooper Nuclear Station, Dresden Generating Station, Monticello Nuclear Generating Plant, and San Onofre Nuclear Generating Station. The newest fuel currently in storage has been at the site since 1989, and the basins are essentially full. No new fuel will be received and storage is limited to the current inventory.

References

Buildings and structures in Grundy County, Illinois
Energy infrastructure in Illinois
Nuclear fuel infrastructure in the United States
Radioactive waste repositories in the United States